The Heinkel He 176 was a German experimental rocket-powered aircraft. It was the world's first aircraft to be propelled solely by a liquid-fueled rocket, making its first powered flight on 20 June 1939 with Erich Warsitz at the controls. It was a private venture by the Heinkel company in accordance with director Ernst Heinkel's emphasis on developing technology for high-speed flight. The performance of the He 176 was not spectacular, but it did provide "proof of concept" for rocket propulsion.

All documents regarding the He 176 were destroyed during the war. The Warsitz biography suggests material is in the Soviet/Russian archives. The often quoted performance data of the aircraft, such as a speed reaching 750 km/h, or 800 km/h in Warsitz's biography, as well as some of the drawings, are not based on sound documents. Only two true pictures of the He 176 have survived which were probably taken in Peenemünde during tests.

Design and development
During the 1920s, German daredevils had experimented with using solid-fuel rockets to propel cars, motorcycles, railway carriages, snow sleds, and, by 1929, aircraft such as Alexander Lippisch's Ente and Fritz von Opel's RAK.1. Solid-fuel rockets, however, have major disadvantages when used for aircraft propulsion, as their thrust cannot be throttled, and the engines cannot be shut down until the fuel is exhausted.

In the late 1930s, Wernher von Braun's rocketry team working at Peenemünde investigated installing liquid-fuelled rockets in aircraft. Heinkel enthusiastically supported their efforts, supplying a He 72 and later two He 112s for the experiments. In early 1937, one of these aircraft was flown with its piston engine shut down during flight, so being   propelled by rocket power alone. At the same time, Hellmuth Walter's experiments into Hydrogen peroxide monopropellant-based rockets were leading towards light and simple rockets that appeared well-suited for aircraft installation, although at the price of considerable danger and limited duration.

The He 176 was built to utilise one of the new Walter engines. It was a tiny, simple aircraft, built almost entirely out of wood, but did possess an advanced, totally enclosed cockpit, with a frameless single-piece clear nose, through which the pilot's rudder pedal mounts were visible, and the landing gear was a combination of conventional and tricycle gear designs, with the main gear's struts intended to retract rearwards into the fuselage, with a fixed, aerodynamically faired nose wheel and strut, a clumsy plexiglas bubble installed after the pilot entered the plane as described by Warsitz and shown, barely, in the one take off photograph, which cockpit was fitted around Warsitz's body, and a retractable tail wheel.  The drawing here shows a flush glazing.   There is no evidence this was actually used.  A unique feature of the He 176 was its jettisonable nose escape system. Compressed air was used to separate the nose from the aircraft. A drogue chute was used to reduce the opening force required. After the drogue was deployed, the flush-fitting cockpit canopy was released and a conventional pilot/parachute bailout occurred.

The basic design of the He 176 was sketched out during the Neuhardenberg rocket motor and booster tests. According to Walter Künzel, "...The He 176 project came into existence during the flight trials of the He 112 at Neuhardenburg. It was a bold project for the time and involved numerous new problems. At this time the term 'interceptor' was being bandied about and the He 176 was to be the research aircraft for the 'interceptor'." In 1936, the RLM awarded Heinkel the contract to build the world's first rocket aircraft. The greatest diameter of the fuselage was only . The wings contained the 82% hydrogen peroxide fuel. According to Warsitz, speaking of Von Braun's cooperation during the tests a Pennemunde, "Although not technically part of the He 176-V1 project with the Walter rocket engine, naturally everything affecting it was of interest to himself and his colleagues because the He 176-V2 was to have the von Braun engine..."

Warsitz describes the world's first manned rocket flight of 20 June 1939, "On quite another heading from that originally intended she leapt into the air and flew with a yaw and a wobble. I kept her close to the ground while gaining speed, then pulled back gently on the control stick for rapid ascent. I was at 750 kms/hr and without any loss in speed the machine shot skywards at an angle somewhere between vertical and 45°. She was enormously sensitive to the controls...Everything turned out wonderfully, however, and it was a relief to fly round the northern tip of Usedom Island without a sound at 800 kms/hr. I banked sharp left again to straighten up for the airstrip, losing such speed and altitude as I could, and during this steep turn the rocket died as the tanks dried up. The abrupt loss of speed hurled me forward in my restraint straps. I pressed the stick forward, hissed rapidly over the Penne and came in at 500 kms/hr. I crossed the airfield boundary and after several prescribed little bounces the machine came to a stop."

Heinkel demonstrated the aircraft to the RLM, but official lack of interest led to the abandonment of the company's rocket propulsion programme. Testing of the He 176 ended with only one aircraft being built. It was put on display at the Berlin Air Museum and was destroyed by an Allied bombing raid in 1943.

Prior to the cancellation of the programme, plans had been drawn up for a more sophisticated rocket powered aircraft, the hypothetical He 176 V2. This was never constructed, but because it bore the same designation as the aircraft that was actually flown, many books and websites mistakenly publish pictures of it to illustrate its earlier namesake.  This is primarily the post war Gerd Heumann airbrush job and the basis for this is unknown.

Germany did eventually fly an operational rocket-propelled fighter, the Alexander Lippisch-designed Me 163 Komet, but this was made by the competing Messerschmitt firm, using an engine that was a further development of the one that powered the He 176.

Specifications (He 176 V1)

See also

References

External links

1930s German experimental aircraft
Rocket-powered aircraft
World War II experimental aircraft of Germany
Cancelled aircraft projects
He 176
German inventions
Low-wing aircraft
Peenemünde Army Research Center and Airfield